Paulson is a  ghost town in the Boundary Country region of south central British Columbia.

Bonanza Siding on the Columbia and Western Railway was named after the Bonanza mine. This siding became a flag stop on the former Canadian Pacific Railway (CP) line in 1902. That year, brothers Thomas Henry, John William, and George Alfred Paulson, applied for a liquor licence for their new hotel, which housed a general store/post office. In 1904, the post office was renamed Paulson, and George died of injuries sustained when struck by a freight train on the Red Mountain railway. The population was likely larger when a sawmill operated around 1910, but more representative would be 25 in 1918, and 23 in 1944, of which half were CP employees, and a quarter involved in mining.

The Paulson bridge allowed the highway to bypass the settlement. The construction substructure was awarded to D.J. Manning Construction ($178,378) and the superstructure to Dominion Bridge ($726,872). The opening was in 1962. In 2019, the crossing underwent a $6-million rehabilitation.

See also
List of ghost towns in British Columbia

References

Ghost towns in British Columbia